Lynda Gail Clarke (born 1956) is a Canadian Islamic studies scholar and Iranologist and Professor of Religions and Cultures at Concordia University. She is known for her works on Shia Islam and is a winner of Farabi International Award.

Works
 Women in Niqab Speak: A Study of the Niqab in Canada, Canada: Canadian Council of Muslim Women, 2013
 Muslim and Canadian Family Law: A Comparative Primer, With P. Cross, CCMW, 2006
Shīʻite Heritage: Essays on Classical and Modern Traditions, edited & translated with 5 introductory essays, Global Press, SUNY, 2001

See also
 Bada'

References

1956 births
Canadian scholars of Islam
Living people
Farabi International Award recipients
Academic staff of Concordia University
Iranologists
Islamic studies scholars